The Arts & College Preparatory Academy, or ACPA, is a tuition-free, public, charter high school located on the east side of Columbus, Ohio, United States, serving students in grades 7–12.  It was founded in 2002. It is a model charter school combining academics and interdisciplinary arts instruction.  The school has a population of 480 students with wait lists in each grade. Fifty-five percent (55%) of ACPA students come from families living below the federal poverty line. The 480 students are served by 27 full-time faculty and 14 supporting staff.  ACPA is administrated by a superintendent, principal, and vice principal.

References 
 Ohio Charter School Arts and College Preparatory Academy Serves as Safe Place for Gay Students: https://web.archive.org/web/20130429135934/http://stateimpact.npr.org/ohio/2013/03/25/ohio-charter-school-arts-and-college-preparatory-academy-serves-as-safe-place-for-gay-students/
  How Arts and College Preparatory Academy Makes Social Progress Its Mission. https://web.archive.org/web/20130407150139/http://stateimpact.npr.org/ohio/2013/03/29/msnbc-how-arts-and-college-preparatory-academy-makes-social-progress-its-mission/

2002 establishments in Ohio
Charter schools in Ohio
Educational institutions established in 2002
High schools in Columbus, Ohio
Public high schools in Ohio